Mambo most often refers to: 
Mambo (music), a Cuban musical form
Mambo (dance), a dance corresponding to mambo music

Mambo may also refer to:

Music
Mambo section, a section in arrangements of some types of Afro-Caribbean music, particularly danzón; the musical form of the same name developed from this section

Albums
Mambo! (album), a 1954 album by Yma Sumac
Mambo (album), a 1991 album by Spanish music duo Azúcar Moreno
Mambo, album by Jeff Maluleke 
Mambo, album by Remmy Ongala

Songs
"Mambo" (1938 song) by Orestes Lopez
"Mambo" by Leonard Bernstein from West Side Story
"Mambo!" (Helena Paparizou song), 2005
"Mambo", a 2021 song by Steve Aoki and Willy William

Film and television
Mambo (film), a 1954 Italian American film
Mambo Duckman, a character from the television series Duckman
Moshe Mambo, a character from the movie Money Monster

Other uses
Mambo (Vodou), a Haitian Vodou priestess 
Mambo (software), an open source content management system
MAMbo, a nickname for the Bologna Museum of Modern Art in Bologna, Italy
MAMBO, a nickname for the Bogotá Museum of Modern Art in Bogotá, Colombia
Mambo Graphics, the company behind the Australian surf clothing brand Mambo
Tecma Mambo, a French hang glider design

See also 
Mumbo (disambiguation)